John B. Pelletier (born September 22, 1884 - November 29, 1946) served in the California State Assembly for the 44th district from 1935 to 1946 and was born in Canada. He immigrated to the United States in 1895.

Pelletier is famous for the fact that, in 1934, he was a "bum" on Skid Row in Los Angeles when master lobbyist Arthur Samish cleaned him up and successfully ran Pelletier for the California Assembly.

References

Members of the California State Legislature
1884 births
1946 deaths